Petra Lammert (born 3 March 1984 in Freudenstadt, Baden-Württemberg) is a former German shot putter and current bobsledder. She was the 2009 European Indoor champion in the shot put and medallist at the 2006 European Athletics Championships. Her personal best throw in the shot put is 20.04 metres, achieved in May 2007 in Zeven. She was the runner-up in the two-woman bobsled at the 2012 World Championships.

Lammert's first international medal came at the 2003 European Athletics Junior Championships, where she won the bronze medal. She came fifth at the 2005 European Athletics Indoor Championships, won the shot put title at the 2005 European Athletics U23 Championships, and went on to represent her country at the 2005 World Championships in Athletics later that year. In 2006, she was the German Champion in the shot put both indoors and out and won her event at the 2006 European Cup. She was fourth at the 2006 IAAF World Indoor Championships and won her first major senior medal at the 2006 European Athletics Championships, taking the bronze with a throw of 19.17 metres.

She began the following season with a win at the 2007 European Cup Winter Throwing. She achieved her personal best throw of 20.04 m in May that year and managed fifth place at the 2007 World Championships in Athletics held in Osaka. She narrowly missed out on a medal at the 2007 IAAF World Athletics Final, ending the competition in fourth place. She missed major competitions in 2008, but returned to win her first major title at the 2009 European Athletics Indoor Championships by throwing an indoor best of 19.66 m. She was the runner-up at the 2010 European Team Championships and finished behind Nadine Kleinert at the 2010 German Athletics Championships. Lammert placed sixth at the 2010 European Athletics Championships in Barcelona.

In November 2010 she announced her retirement from the sport through persistent elbow injury she had first sustained after a fall in training two years earlier. In early 2011 she decided to turn her athletic prowess to bobsleigh and she quickly established herself as one of Germany's best female brakewomen. She was selected to compete in the two-woman event at the FIBT World Championships 2012 alongside Sandra Kiriasis and won the silver medal, finishing a third of a second behind the winning Canadian team. In the 2011–12 Bobsleigh World Cup series she finished in the top three in Igls, Altenberg and Calgary.

Shot put achievements

References

External links 
 
 
 
  
 

1984 births
Living people
People from Freudenstadt
Sportspeople from Karlsruhe (region)
German female shot putters
German national athletics champions
German female bobsledders
European Athletics Championships medalists